WW domain-containing adapter protein with coiled-coil is a protein that in humans is encoded by the WAC gene.

The protein encoded by this gene contains a WW domain, which is a protein module found in a wide range of signaling proteins. This domain mediates protein-protein interactions and binds proteins containing short linear peptide motifs that are proline-rich or contain at least one proline. This gene product shares 94% sequence identity with the WAC protein in mouse, however, its exact function is not known.

References

Further reading